Apam balik also known as Martabak Manis,, terang bulan,  peanut pancake or mànjiānguǒ, is a sweet dessert originating in Fujian cuisine which now consists of many varieties at specialist roadside stalls or restaurants throughout Brunei, Indonesia, Malaysia and Singapore.

Mànjiān (曼煎) is a homophone of Mǎnqīng (滿清), which ruled the final imperial dynasty in China, while guǒ (粿) means pancake.

Origins

The origins of Apam balik / 曼煎粿 attributes its invention to Zuo Zongtang, a military leader of the late Qing dynasty. In 1855, the army of the Taiping Heavenly Kingdom invaded the Fujian region and General Zuo was appointed to lead an army to crush the rebels. To provide the soldiers with food without interfering the life of local people, General Zuo decided to switch from the flatbread which was eaten together with spring onion and chilli sauce, to a pancake that used locally sourced and mass-produced ground cane sugar and peanut as filling.

The recipe does seem to have spread throughout the Fujian region, especially around Quanzhou and later on throughout Southeast China. It was brought south into Southeast Asia or Nanyang by Hokkien and Teochew immigrants, especially to Singapore, and merchants spread it to neighbouring regions.

Other names 
The dessert is also known by various names in different languages, depending on the region.

Indonesia 

 Terang Bulan, refer to the big round pancake, prior to folding, resembling the shape of a full moon, (Eastern Central Java, most of East Java (e.g. Blitar and Malang), Lesser Sunda Islands, southern Kalimantan, East Kalimantan, Sulawesi, Maluku and Western New Guinea)
 Martabak Manis,  (Southern Sumatra, Banten, Jakarta, Bandung, West Java, western Central Java and the most of Yogyakarta)
 Kue Bandung (in Semarang, Central Java)
 Martabak Bangka (Northern Sumatra and Bintan Island)
 Apam Pinang (in West Kalimantan and North Kalimantan)
 Hok Lo Pan (福佬粄) (in Bangka Belitung Islands and Batam);

Malaysia and Singapore 
 Ban Jian Kueh (Tâi-lô: bàn-tsian-kué) (Hokkien, in general for both countries)
 Dai Gau Min (大塊麵) (Cantonese, in Perak)
 Chin Loong Pau (煎弄包) (Cantonese, in Kuala Lumpur/Selangor)
 Kap Piang 合餅 (Hakka, in Sabah)
 Mak Pan 麥粄 (Hakka, in general for both countries)
 Apam Pulau Pinang (Malay, in Penang)
 Kuih Haji (Malay, in certain areas)
 Apam Balik (Malay, in certain areas)
 Apong (Malay, in Kelantan)
 Apang Balek (Malay, in Terengganu and in certain areas of Pahang)
 Apom Balek (Malay, in Kedah)
 Terang Bulan (Malay, in Sabah)

Brunei 
 Kuih Malaya/Singapura (Malay, in Brunei), named during the colonial era when masses of Chinese emigrants went to the region in places such as Singapore

China 
 滿煎糕

Hong Kong 
 冷糕 (Cantonese)
 砂糖夾餅 (Cantonese)

Singapore 
 Min Chiang Kueh/Min Jiang Kueh (Teochew, in Singapore)
 Peanut Pancake (麵煎粿) (Singapore)

Taiwan 
 麥仔煎 (Taiwanese Hokkien)

Description 
The pancake's batter is made from a mixture of flour, eggs, sugar, baking soda, coconut milk and water. The batter is cooked upon a thick round iron frying pan in plenty of palm margarine to avoid it sticking to the pan. Then other ingredients are sprinkled as filling; the most common or traditional is crushed peanut granules with sugar and sweetcorn kernels (available from cans), but modern innovations such as chocolate sprinkles and cheddar cheese are also available. Then, the pancake is folded (hence the name: "turnover pancake") and cut into several pieces.

In Indonesia there is a smaller version made with smaller pan, they are called martabak mini or terang bulan mini.

The texture of the apam balik can vary depending on the amount of batter and type of pan used, from one that is akin to a crispier form of crumpets to small thin light pancake shells that break when bitten (the latter is usually called apam balik nipis, 'thin apam balik').

There is a Peranakan variant, the apom balik, that closely resembles the Indonesian Serabi.

See also 
 List of pancakes
 List of stuffed dishes
 Peranakan cuisine
 Dosai

References 

Pancakes
Chinese cuisine
Bruneian cuisine
Indonesian breads
Indonesian desserts
Indonesian pancakes
Indonesian snack foods
Malaysian breads
Singaporean cuisine
Stuffed dishes